Ameles maroccana is a species of praying mantis found in Morocco.

References

maroccana
Endemic fauna of Morocco
Mantodea of Africa
Insects of North Africa
Insects described in 1931